"Just Stop" is a song by the American heavy metal band Disturbed. It was released on 7 February 2006, as the third single from their studio album, Ten Thousand Fists.

Track listing

US promo

Charts

Personnel
 David Draiman – vocals, backing vocals
 Dan Donegan – guitars, electronics
 John Moyer – bass, backing vocals
 Mike Wengren – drums

References

2006 singles
2005 songs
Disturbed (band) songs
Songs written by Dan Donegan
Songs written by David Draiman
Songs written by Mike Wengren
Reprise Records singles
Song recordings produced by Johnny K